was a Japanese officer during World War II. After the war he was put on trial during the Yokohama War Crimes Trials for ordering executions of captured American aircrew in 1945. Okada was found guilty, sentenced to death, and hanged in 1949. 

Okada took responsibility for ordering the execution of 38 captured U.S. POWs, after he considered them to be war criminals for the firebombings of Japan.

In popular culture
The war crimes trial of Okada was depicted in the 2007 film, Best Wishes for Tomorrow. He was played by Makoto Fujita.

References

1890 births
1949 deaths
Japanese mass murderers
Japanese military personnel of World War II
Massacres committed by Japan
Massacres in 1945
Military personnel from Tottori Prefecture

Japanese people executed for war crimes
Executed mass murderers
People executed by the United States military by hanging
Perpetrators of World War II prisoner of war massacres